Seven Stones and similar may refer to:
 Seven stones (game), a traditional Indian game
 Seven Stones Reef, a rock reef off the coast of England
 Sevenstones Lightship
 Seven Stones (song), a 1971 song by Genesis

See also 
 Sevenstone, a retail development in Sheffield, England